Liam Harris (born 20 April 1997) is a professional rugby league footballer who plays as a  for the York Knights in the Betfred Championship.

He played for Hull Kingston Rovers in the Kingstone Press Championship, and on loan from Hull KR at the York City Knights in Kingstone Press League 1. He played for Doncaster in Betfred League 1 and Hull FC in the Super League.

Background
Harris was born in Kingston upon Hull, East Riding of Yorkshire, England.

Playing career
In 2018 he made his Super League début for Hull F.C. against Hull Kingston Rovers.

Halifax
On 17 November 2020, it was announced that Harris would join Halifax for 2021.

York City
On 12 October 2021, it was reported that he had signed for York City in the RFL Championship

References

External links
Hull FC profile
SL profile

1997 births
Living people
Doncaster R.L.F.C. players
English rugby league players
Halifax R.L.F.C. players
Hull F.C. players
Hull Kingston Rovers players
Rugby league halfbacks
Rugby league players from Kingston upon Hull
York City Knights players